Lương Tài is a rural district of Bắc Ninh province in the Red River Delta region of Vietnam. As of 2003 the district had a population of 103,156. The district covers an area of 101 km². The district capital lies at Thứa.

Notable people
Lương Tài is the hometown of Hàn Thuyên, Vũ Kính, Vũ Giới, Phạm Quang Tiến, Vũ Miên, Vũ Trinh

References

Districts of Bắc Ninh province